This is a list of hotels in Metro Manila. The list includes both current and historic hotels.

Current hotels

See also
 List of hotels in the Philippines
 Lists of hotels – an index of hotel list articles on Wikipedia

References

External links

Metro Manila
 
Hotels
Metro Manila